Raymond Fafiani (born 22 December 1983 in Amsterdam) is a Dutch former professional footballer who currently plays as a midfielder for amateur side JOS.

Club career
Fafiani was scouted by Jan Jongbloed at local amateur side DWV to join Vitesse. He spent the large part of his career playing in the Dutch Eerste Divisie, but made his professional debut for Eredivisie side Vitesse against Roda JC in September 2003 and also had a season at FC Twente in the top tier. He was released by the club in summer 2006 after spending a season on loan at FC Zwolle and joined Telstar on loan before signing permanently. He would spend 6 years at the club.

In 2012 Fafiani signed a 2-year contract with FC Volendam, where he was voted player of the season, and in 2015 the left-footed midfielder was snapped up by Fortuna Sittard. After suffering a serious injury, he was released and moved to Hoofdklasse side JOS.

References

External links
 Voetbal International profile 

1983 births
Living people
Footballers from Amsterdam
Association football midfielders
Dutch footballers
SBV Vitesse players
FC Twente players
PEC Zwolle players
SC Telstar players
FC Volendam players
Fortuna Sittard players
Eredivisie players
Eerste Divisie players
JOS Watergraafsmeer players